Pablo Martín Páez Gavira (born 5 August 2004), known as Gavi, is a Spanish professional footballer who plays as a central midfielder for La Liga club Barcelona and the Spain national team. In 2022, he won the Golden Boy award and received the Kopa Trophy, awarded by France Football during the 2022 Ballon d'Or ceremony.

Club career

Early life and career
Gavi was born in Los Palacios y Villafranca, Andalusia. He started his career at La Liara Balompié, a club in his hometown, where he spent two years, between 2010 and 2012. From there he moved on to Real Betis's youth academy, where he spent two seasons. He scored 95 goals for the youth team of Real Betis.

Barcelona

Youth career
In 2015, at the age of 11, he signed for Barcelona.

In September 2020, he signed his first professional contract with the Catalan club, and was promoted directly from the under-16 team to the under-19 team. He made his debut for Barcelona B on 21 February 2021, in the 6–0 home routing of L'Hospitalet, coming on as a substitute for Nico González in the 77th minute. He made his first start for Barça B the following 14 March in a 1–0 derby win against Espanyol B at the Ciutat Esportiva Dani Jarque.

2021–22 season
Having featured twice for Barcelona B in the 2020–21 season, Gavi was promoted to the senior squad for pre-season friendlies with the first team ahead of the start of the new season. After good performances in wins against Gimnàstic de Tarragona and Girona, Gavi was reported to have pushed ahead of Riqui Puig in manager Ronald Koeman's squad selection. He continued this good run of form in a 3–0 win against German opposition VfB Stuttgart, earning comparisons with Barcelona legend Xavi.

On 29 August 2021, he played his first official match for Barcelona's first team in the 2–1 La Liga win over Getafe, replacing Sergi Roberto in the 73rd minute. On 18 December, he scored his first goal for the club and provided an assist in the 3–2 home win over Elche.

2022–23 season
On 15 January 2023, Gavi scored a goal and provided two assists to be named man of the match in a 3–1 victory over Real Madrid in the Supercopa de España Final. On 31 January, a Spanish court ruled in favor of accepting Gavi's new contract with Barcelona until 2026, signed in September the previous year, despite opposition from La Liga president Javier Tebas who argued that the new deal would not fit in the club's salary limit that season. On the same day, Barcelona announced that Gavi would acquire the number 6 shirt, previously worn by his coach Xavi.

International career 
Gavi has represented Spain at under-15 and under-16 level.

On 30 September 2021, Gavi received a surprise call-up to the senior Spain national team by the manager Luis Enrique. He made his debut in their UEFA Nations League semi-final win against Italy on 6 October, becoming the youngest player to ever represent Spain at senior level. In the final against France on 10 October, Spain ultimately suffered a 2–1 defeat. On 5 June 2022, he scored his first senior goal in the Nations League away against the Czech Republic, becoming the youngest player to ever score representing Spain at senior level.

Gavi was named in Spain's squad for the 2022 FIFA World Cup in Qatar, in which he started in all four matches. With his goal against Costa Rica in Spain's first game of the tournament, Gavi became the third youngest player (only behind Pelé and Manuel Rosas) to score in a World Cup match.

Style of play
Graham Hunter of ESPN hailed Gavi as a highly promising young player in 2021, comparing him to former Barcelona midfielders Xavi and Andrés Iniesta due to his qualities as a footballer, including his dribbling, anticipation, intelligence, vision, passing, first touch, close control, change of pace, and ability to turn quickly to get out of tight spaces and initiate counter-attacks. Following his performance in Spain's semi-final victory over Italy in the 2021 Nations League Finals, Italian defender Emerson Palmieri described Gavi as a player who "has huge potential."

Career statistics

Club

International

Spain score listed first, score column indicates score after each Gavi goal

Honours
Barcelona
Supercopa de España: 2022–23

Spain
UEFA Nations League runner-up: 2020–21

Individual
Kopa Trophy: 2022
Golden Boy: 2022
IFFHS Men's World Youth (U20) Team: 2022
IFFHS Men's Youth (U20) UEFA Team: 2022
Trofeo Aldo Rovira: 2021–22

References

External links

Profile at the FC Barcelona website

2004 births
Living people
People from Los Palacios y Villafranca
Sportspeople from the Province of Seville
Footballers from Andalusia
Spanish footballers
Association football midfielders
Real Betis players
FC Barcelona players
FC Barcelona Atlètic players
Segunda División B players
Primera Federación players
La Liga players
Spain youth international footballers
Spain international footballers
2022 FIFA World Cup players